The  is a road bridge on Japan National Route 298 and the Tokyo Gaikan Expressway that spans the Arakawa/Shingashi River and the Arakawa Adjustment Pond (Ayako) between Bijogi, Toda and Niikura, Wakō in Saitama Prefecture. It is also known as Kotamabashi.

References

Bridges completed in 1992
Road bridges in Japan

Transport_in_Saitama_Prefecture
Cable-stayed_bridges_in_Japan